Juan Pistolas is a 1936 Mexican adventure film directed by Roberto Curwood and starring Raúl de Anda, Lucha Ruanova and Javier de la Parra.

Cast 
 Raúl de Anda as Juan Pistolas  
 Lucha Ruanova as Rosita  
 Javier de la Parra as Juanito 
 Joaquín Grajales as Don Chencho  
 Refugio Silva as Lolita  
 Manuel Buendía as Pepe Montes  
 David Valle González as Matías  
 Ángel Moreno as Ramón  
 Isauro Ruiz as Ricardo  
 Antonio Peimbert as Pablo Fernández  
 Lepe as Medrano  
 Ernesto Cuevas as Lucas  
 Federico Calcáneo as Federico  
 Gilberto González 
 Max Langler
 Juan Garcia

References

Bibliography 
 Pick, M. Zuzana. Constructing the Image of the Mexican Revolution: Cinema and the Archive. University of Texas Press, 2010.

External links 
 

1936 films
1936 adventure films
Mexican adventure films
1930s Spanish-language films
Mexican black-and-white films
1930s Mexican films